The Gończy Polski, sometimes translated as the Polish Hound or the Polish Hunting Dog, is a breed of scent hound originating in Poland.

Overview
The Gończy Polski is a medium-sized hound, usually black and tan in colour. A smaller variety of the more common Polish Hound, it almost became extinct after the Second World War and only became known in the West after the fall of Communism.

See also
 Dogs portal
 List of dog breeds

References

Dog breeds originating in Poland
FCI breeds
Scent hounds